Kaliyugam is a 1952 Indian, Tamil language film directed by V. S. Dhrupad. The film stars S. M. Kumaresan and B. S. Saroja.

Cast
List adapted from the database of Film News Anandan.

Male cast
S. M. Kumaresan
P. G. Venatesan
M. M. Mariyappa
K. A. Thangavelu

Female cast
B. S. Saroja
S. Nandhini

Production
The film was produced by Gordan Bai Merchant who also wrote the story, and was directed by V. S. Drupad. Screenplay was written by Maheshvel while the dialogues were penned by Viswanathan. Cinematography was handled by Vasanth N. Bhuva and the editing was done by G. G. Basheer. Hiralal Patel was in charge of art direction. Music was composed by Vimalkumar. The film was made at Srikanth Studios in Bombay.

References

1950s Tamil-language films